Nattaporn Phanrit (born January 11, 1982), simply known as Oat, is a Thai retired professional footballer who played as a centre-back. He initially played as a left back but moved inside to more central position later, he is regularly serving both the club and national team as centre back.

Club career

Nattaporn spent his youth career with Assumption Sriracha College between 1999 and 2000. He signed his first professional contract with Thai Premier League side Tobacco Monopoly (now TTM Chiangmai F.C.) in 2001. The left back at the moment spent 4 years with the club and won 1 Thai Premier League title in 2004–2005.

The defender left the club in 2005 to join PEA (later became to Buriram PEA) and spent a season with the new club.

In 2007, Nattaporn joined a newly Thai Premier League champions Chonburi. However, the only accomplishment of his new club in the 2007–2008 season was only winning Kor Royal Cup, while finished only runners up in the league, ironically, the champions were his former club PEA, and the club were also knocked out of AFC Champions League in the group stage.

In contrast, the strong centre back won 2008's Defender of the Year award.

In 2009, the Thai defender switched to a Nonthaburi based club Muangthong United. This time he won league title with his new club in the first season, and also managed to retain the title in the next year. The 2009 Thai Premier League title was his second league title after a long wait from 2004 league title with Tobacco Monopoly (TTM Phichit F.C. at the time)

As of upcoming 2012 season, Nattaporn made totally 262 appearances with 4 Thai Premier League clubs and scored a wonder 16 goals as a defender.

Nattaporn officially announced his retirement from professional football on 11 January 2019 with 18 years on football path.

International career
Nattaporn was first called up to Thailand national team in 2003, initially served as left back before firmly established himself into the first team as centre back. He was a first team regular in the reign of Peter Reid and Bryan Robson but later dropped to a substitution in recent months of German Winfried Schafer's management. Nattaporn played in the 2012 King's Cup and the 2012 AFF Suzuki Cup.

Nattaporn played in the 2010 Asian Games.

Nattaporn was also a member of the victorious T&T Cup 2008 winning squad.

International goals

Honours

Club
Tobacco Monopoly
 Thai Premier League (1): 2004-05

Chonburi
 Kor Royal Cup (1): 2008

Muangthong United
 Thai Premier League (2): 2009, 2010

International
Thailand U-23
 Sea Games  Gold medal (2): 2003, 2005

Thailand
 T&T Cup (1): 2008

Individual
 Thai Premier League Defender of the Year (1): 2008

References

External links
 

1982 births
Living people
Nattaporn Phanrit
Nattaporn Phanrit
Association football central defenders
Nattaporn Phanrit
Nattaporn Phanrit
Nattaporn Phanrit
Nattaporn Phanrit
Nattaporn Phanrit
Nattaporn Phanrit
Nattaporn Phanrit
Nattaporn Phanrit
Nattaporn Phanrit
Nattaporn Phanrit
Nattaporn Phanrit
Nattaporn Phanrit
2004 AFC Asian Cup players
2007 AFC Asian Cup players
Footballers at the 2010 Asian Games
Nattaporn Phanrit
Southeast Asian Games medalists in football
Competitors at the 2003 Southeast Asian Games
Competitors at the 2005 Southeast Asian Games
Nattaporn Phanrit